Tourniquets, Hacksaws and Graves is the seventh studio album by American death metal band Autopsy. It was released in April 2014. As with all Autopsy albums, it was released through Peaceville Records, and as with all albums since the band's 2009 reunion, it is produced by Adam Munoz alongside the band. The last album to feature bassist Joe Trevisano.

Background
Autopsy released their sixth studio album, The Headless Ritual in June 2013. Building on the leftover tracks from the recording sessions that April that produced the Headless Ritual album the band returned to the studio in September to complete work on their seventh effort. The band said of the album "Tourniquets tighten... hacksaws rip... graves are filled...This is Autopsy, this is death metal. With the stench of 'The Headless Ritual' still permeating the befouled air, Autopsy has once again come for your very metal soul with their newest blood-soaked homage to all things dark, twisted and horrific... once again, bone-crushingly heavy nightmares await. 'Tourniquets, Hacksaws And Graves' will awaken the most depraved part of the coldest zombie's stare... blood will flow, brains will be destroyed, coffin lids will be opened."

Track listing

Personnel
Credits adapted from liner notes.

Autopsy
Danny Coralles – guitars, piano (track 9), backing vocals (track 12)
Eric Cutler – guitars, lead vocals (track 6), backing vocals (track 12)
Chris Reifert – drums, lead vocals (all but 6 and 8), backing vocals (track 12)
Joe Trevisano – bass, backing vocals (track 12)

Additional personnel
Don Hopper – backing vocals (track 12)
Ron Falcon – backing vocals (track 12)
Aaron Cronon – backing vocals (track 12)
Ken Lee – mastering
Courtney McCutcheon – photography
Adam Munoz – recording, mixing, producer
Wes Benscoter – artwork

References

Autopsy (band) albums
2014 albums